The Search is a  science fiction short story by Canadian-American writer A. E. van Vogt, originally published in Astounding in January 1943. The story involves time travel and is told in a non-linear fashion with multiple plot twists.

Plot summary
Drake, a travelling salesmen for the Quik-Rite pen company, awakes in the hospital with no memories of the last two weeks. His boss tells him that he disappeared in the middle of his last business trip. In an attempt to piece together what happened, he sets out to recreate the journey. While waiting for a train, another traveller, Kellie, remembers him. Drake explains his predicament, and Kellie recounts their last encounter.

The two met on a train two weeks ago. When Drake explained he sold pens, Kellie produced a fountain pen he purchased from a girl who boarded their train on an earlier trip. It condensed ink from the atmosphere, so it never ran out, could be adjusted to print in any color, and cost only $1. When an older man next to them asks to examine it, it broke, and the man gave Kellie a dollar for its replacement.

Soon after, the girl, Selanie, boarded the train. This time, she was selling a folding travel cup that filled itself with a selection of refreshing drinks when opened up. As she made her way through the cabin to sell them to eager customers, Drake showed her the broken pen and asked if he could buy a new one. Startled, she asked how it broke. When Drake pointed to the man, she turned to look at him and then ran from the train. Drake followed her off the train. That was the last Kellie saw of Drake.

Drake returns to the station where he exited the train two weeks earlier, and learns from some locals that he disappeared after following Selanie to a motorhome. The following day, an old man appeared in town, and stole all the gear Selanie had sold, leaving behind a dollar bill for each one. Drake visits the location of the motorhome, but it is no longer there. Learning little else, he travels to the nearest town and books into a hotel. While sitting in the lounge, he overhears someone breaking an object and offering to pay a dollar for it. He turns to confront the man.

Drake awakes in an apartment filled with advanced technology. He spends a day exploring what appears to be an enormous empty city before returning to the apartment at night to sleep. He awakes next to an unknown woman, who reveals herself to be a somewhat older version of the girl from the train, now apparently his wife. Utterly confused, Drake is taken to meet someone in authority, who explains the situation.

Drake is a member of the Possessors, a time-travel police force. Selanie's father is a time traveller who hoped to upset the formation of the Possessors by selling advanced technology in the 1940s when the Possessors were first forming. Drake had been sent to sabotage his plans, disguised as someone interested in stealing their pen's technology. Had he been successful, the three of them would be left trapped in the past for a time, where he and Selanie would fall in love. But something went wrong, and he was dumped two weeks in the future.

The story ends with Drake preparing to leave on the mission once again, this time prepared to properly surprise Selanie's father. Selanie's farewell demonstrates that this attempt must have been successful.

Versions
The Search was included in 1952's Destination: Universe!, the first of a number of Van Vogt short story collections, and again in Transfinite, the 2003 collection.

The Search also forms part of one of Van Vogt's fix-up novels, Quest for the Future (1970). The story remains similar to the original, but the names are changed to follow the overarching story of the fix-up. The results are not considered to be a success, and the low quality of these fix-ups has been suggested as one of the reasons for van Vogt's decline in popularity.

References

Sources
 

1943 short stories
American short stories
Science fiction short stories
Short stories by A. E. van Vogt
Works originally published in Analog Science Fiction and Fact
Nonlinear narrative literature